Wildwood is an unincorporated community along Belvidere Road (Illinois Route 120) just east of U.S. Route 45 in Lake County, Illinois. Wildwood is part of the Gages Lake census-designated place and is bordered by Gages Lake Road to the north, Gurnee to the northeast and east, Libertyville to the south, and Grayslake to the west.

Lakes
 Gages Lake
 Valley Lake

External links

Unincorporated communities in Illinois
Unincorporated communities in Lake County, Illinois